Ebba Thomsen (3 May 1887 – 18 December 1973) was a Danish actress during the golden era of silent films in Denmark. Thomsen was best known for her roles as the elegant leading lady opposite the Danish matinee idol Valdemar Psilander.

Life and career
Ebba Thomsen was born in Copenhagen, Denmark on 3 May 1887,  the daughter of Ove Thomsen, one of the leading Danish fashion designers. Thomsen debuted on stage at Det Ny Teater in 1910 and began to perform in cinema in 1912 at Nordisk Film. From then until the early 1920s, Thomsen appeared in about 75 films—mostly as the lead actress—and achieved star status in Denmark. Her most notables roles were in films in which she worked with Nordisk Film's biggest male star, Valdemar Psilander.

In a newspaper interview for her 50th birthday, Thomsen said that her "unique success depended on two things: First, that Psilander and I suited one another. I was actually a little too tall for him, yet our types suited each other, our movements, our acting. In short, we were a born 'film-couple'." Thomsen then credited her father with giving her "an absolute sense of style. I knew precisely how every fabric should look on me, whether it was a princess' gown or a washerwoman's rags." Thomsen was usually cast in roles as princesses, countesses, or artists.

In 1915, Thomsen married the Norwegian actor Thorleif Lund.  She left Nordisk Film in 1917 to open a touring company in Norway with her husband. The company failed and Thomsen quickly returned to filmmaking.  In the 1920s she appeared in a series of films for the Danish Astra Film Company under the direction of Fritz Magnussen. She returned to Nordisk for two final films and then retired from film in 1925. She performed on stage for the final time at the Dagmar Theater in 1930.

Thomsen returned to give one performance in a sound film when she appeared in the 1952 Alice O'Fredericks film Husmandstøsen at the age of 65. She died 18 December 1973, aged 86.

Filmography

References

External links

<Ebba Thomsen at the Den Danske Film Database (in Danish)

Danish film actresses
Danish stage actresses
Danish silent film actresses
20th-century Danish actresses
1887 births
1973 deaths